In 2012 the GCC countries established the GCC Futsal Cup like the Arabian Gulf Cup, The tournament was founded in 2012, The First Gulf Cup tournament took place in 2013, and was won by the Kuwaiti team

Kuwait has been the most successful team in the cup, winning 2 tournaments out of 2 in total.

In May 2016, a new regional governing body was established to organise the competition, known as the Gulf Cup Federation.

Winners

See also
 Arabian Gulf Cup
 Arab Nations Cup
 GCC U-23 Championship
 GCC U-19 Championship
 GCC U-17 Championship

References

External links
 RSSSF official website
 Gulf Cup official website
 Gulf Cup website

 
Gulf Cooperation Council
Recurring sporting events established in 2012
Futsal competitions in Asia
2012 establishments in Asia